Fatima Bhutto (born 29 May 1982) is a Pakistani writer and columnist. Born in Kabul, she is the daughter of politician Murtaza Bhutto, sister of Zulfikar Ali Bhutto Jr, niece of former Pakistani Prime Minister Benazir Bhutto and granddaughter of former Prime Minister and President of Pakistan, Zulfiqar Ali Bhutto. She was raised in Syria and Karachi, and received her bachelor's degree from Barnard College, followed by a master's degree from the SOAS University of London.

Bhutto is a critic of her aunt Benazir Bhutto and her husband Asif Ali Zardari, whom she accused of being involved in her father's murder. Her non-fiction book, Songs Of Blood And Sword (2010), is about her family. Bhutto has written for The News and The Guardian among other publications.

Early life and education
Bhutto was born on 29 May 1982 to Murtaza Bhutto and an Afghan mother, Fauzia Fasihudin Bhutto, the daughter of Afghanistan's former foreign affairs official in Kabul. Her father was in exile during the military regime of general Zia-ul-Haq. Her parents divorced when she was three years old and her father took Bhutto with him moving from country to country and she grew up effectively stateless. Her father met Ghinwa Bhutto, a Lebanese ballet teacher in 1989 during his exile in Syria and they married. Bhutto considers Ghinwa as her real mother. Her half-brother Zulfikar Ali Bhutto Jr. is an artist based in San Francisco.

Bhutto is the granddaughter of Zulfiqar Ali Bhutto and Nusrat Bhutto, an Iranian Kurd, niece of Benazir Bhutto and her husband Asif Ali Zardari, and Shahnawaz Bhutto. Her father was killed by the police in 1996 in Karachi during the premiership of his sister, Benazir Bhutto. Her biological mother Fauzia Fasihudin unsuccessfully tried to gain parental custody of Bhutto. She lives with her stepmother in Old Clifton, Karachi.

Bhutto received her secondary education at the Karachi American School. She received B.A. degree summa cum laude, majoring in Middle Eastern and Asian languages and cultures from Barnard College, an affiliated women's liberal arts college of Columbia University, in New York, U.S. in 2004.  She received her M.A. in South Asian Studies from the SOAS, University of London in 2005, there she wrote her dissertation on the resistance movement in Pakistan.

Career

Publications and politics
In 1998, at the age of 15, Bhutto published her first book named Whispers of The Desert. Her second book 8.50 a.m. 8 October 2005 marks the moment of the 2005 Kashmir earthquake; it records accounts of those affected.

Bhutto's family memoir Songs of Blood and Sword was published in 2010. In the book Bhutto accuses her aunt Benazir and her husband Asif Zardari for killing her father Murtaza. The book got mixed to negative review from critics for being biased on history of her family. Several family members have accused her of  falsifying information.

In November 2013, her first fictional novel The Shadow Of The Crescent Moon published. The book had long-listed in 2014 for the Baileys Women's Prize for Fiction. In 2015 Bhutto's short story titled Democracy, an  e-book, under Penguin Books was released.

In 2019, her second novel,The Runaways was  published. The book explore three young Muslim men's journey to radicalization. The novel received critical acclaim for its subject. In October of the same year , New Kings of the World: Dispatches from Bollywood, Dizi and K-Pop was published. Tash Aw in the Financial Times described it as a "razor-sharp, intriguing introduction to the various pop phenomena emerging from Asia."

Following the assassination of her aunt, Benazir Bhutto in 2007, there was speculation over her entrance into politics. In an interview, she has stated that for now she prefers to remain active through her activism and writing, rather than through elected office and that she has to "rule a political career out entirely because of the effect of dynasties on Pakistan", referring to the Bhutto family dynasty and its ties to Pakistani politics. Although Bhutto is politically active, she is not affiliated with any political party.

Personal life
In 2009, it was reported that she was in a relationship with George Clooney.

About her religious faith, Bhutto said at an interview, that she is a cultural muslim and describes herself as a secularist. Bhutto has defended Islam on many occasions and supported Muslim women's right to wear burqa. She is fluent in Urdu, Persian, Arabic, and English.

Bibliography
 Whispers of The Desert Karachi : Oxford University Press, 1998. , 
 8.50 a.m. 8 October 2005 Karachi : Oxford University Press, 2006. , 
 Songs of Blood and Sword New York : Nation Books, 2011. , 
 The Shadow of the Crescent Moon New York : Penguin Books, 2013. , 
 Democracy (2015)
 The Runaways London : Viking, 2018. ,  
New Kings of the World: Dispatches from Bollywood, Dizi, and K-Pop New York : Columbia Global Reports, 2019.

References

External links
Official Fatima Bhutto Website
 Fatima Bhutto: Living on the Edge by William Dalrymple for the Times Online, 18 May 2008
Fatima Bhutto on Her Memoir, Songs of Blood and Sword
 In Conversation: Songs of Corruption: Christian Parenti with Fatima Bhutto, The Brooklyn Rail

1982 births
Living people
Pakistani women poets
Pakistani activists
Pakistani women activists
Pakistani women short story writers
People from Kabul
People from Clifton, Karachi
Fatima
Pakistani people of Afghan descent
Barnard College alumni
Alumni of SOAS University of London
Writers from Karachi
Journalists from Karachi
Pakistani women journalists
Karachi American School alumni
Pakistani novelists
Pakistani expatriates in Syria
Pakistani people of Iranian descent
Pakistani people of Kurdish descent
Pakistani exiles
21st-century Pakistani writers
21st-century Pakistani women writers
Pakistani secularists